Mutrie is a surname, and may refer to:

 Annie Feray Mutrie (1826–1893), British painter
 Jim Mutrie (1851–1938), American baseball pioneer
 John Mutrie (1849–1929), Canadian farmer and political figure 
 Les Mutrie (1951–2017), English footballer 
 Martha Darley Mutrie (1824–1885), British painter